The Kamenets-Podolsky uezd was one of the uezds (uyezds or subdivisions) of the Podolian Governorate of the Russian Empire. It was situated in the northwestern part of the governorate. Its administrative centre was Kamianets-Podilskyi (Kamenets-Podolsky).

Demographics
At the time of the Russian Empire Census of 1897, Kamenets-Podolsky Uyezd had a population of 266,350. Of these, 78.9% spoke Ukrainian, 13.9% Yiddish, 4.1% Russian, 2.7% Polish, 0.1% German and 0.1% Tatar as their native language.

References

 
Uezds of Podolia Governorate